So This Is Freedom is an album by the Massachusetts-based punk rock band The Unseen, released in 1999.

Track listing
"What Are You Gonna Do?" (lyrics: Mark music: Scott)       2:18
"Are We Dead Yet?" (lyrics & music: Paul)             2:58
"Stand Up and Fight" (lyrics: Tripp & Mark music: Tripp)           2:11
"Punks Attack" (lyrics & music: Paul)                 2:27
"Dead and Gone" (lyrics: Mark Music: Tripp)                2:20
"There's Still Hope" (lyrics: Paul & Mark music: Paul & Scott)           3:53
"Greed Is a Disease" (lyrics: Mark music: Scott)           1:20
"Piss Off" (lyrics: Trip music: Tripp & Paul)                     2:15
"Don't be Fooled" (lyrics & music: Tripp)              1:34
"Cultural Genocide" (lyrics: Tripp music: Scott & Paul)            1:57
"Sent to Die" (lyrics: Mark music: Scott & Mark)                  1:48
"Tradition" (lyrics: Tripp music: Tripp & Paul)                    1:52
"So This Is Freedom?" (lyrics: Tripp music: Tripp & Scott)          2:52
"Beat It" (Michael Jackson cover) 1:51

Personnel
Mark - Drums, Vocals
Paul - Guitar, Drums, Vocals, Organ
Tripp - Bass, Vocals
Scott - Guitar, Vocals
Bill Brown - additional vocals (track 8)

References

External links
So This Is Freedom? @ discogs.com

The Unseen (band) albums
1999 albums
A-F Records albums